Paraprotomyzon is a genus of gastromyzontid loaches endemic to China.

Species
There are currently four known species in this genus:
 Paraprotomyzon bamaensis W. Q. Tang, 1997
 Paraprotomyzon lungkowensis C. X. Xie, G. R. Yang & L. X. Gong, 1984
 Paraprotomyzon multifasciatus Pellegrin & P. W. Fang, 1935
 Paraprotomyzon niulanjiangensis Y. F. Lu, Zong-Min Lu & W. N. Mao, 2005

References

Gastromyzontidae
Fish of Asia
Fish of China